Logan Sindre Paulsen (born February 26, 1987) is a former American football tight end. He was signed by the Washington Redskins as an undrafted free agent in 2010.  He played college football at UCLA. Before that, he played at Chaminade College Preparatory High School in West Hills, California.

Professional career

Washington Redskins

Paulsen was signed by the Washington Redskins as an undrafted free agent following the 2010 NFL Draft. He was made the third-string tight end behind Chris Cooley and Fred Davis. Paulsen made his NFL debut in Week 3 against the St. Louis Rams. He scored his first career touchdown against the Tampa Bay Buccaneers on December 12, 2010, on a one-yard pass from Donovan McNabb. At the end of the 2010 season, Paulsen played 11 games and recorded two receptions for 10 yards total and one touchdown.

During the 2011 season, against the Carolina Panthers, Paulsen caught two passes for 48 yards. Late in the season, Paulsen was made the starting tight end with Cooley on injured reserve and Davis suspended. Playing 16 games, starting six of them, Paulsen recorded 11 receptions and 138 receiving yards at the end of the season.

By the start of the 2012 season, Paulsen was once again named the third-string tight end behind Fred Davis and Niles Paul. In the Week 7 game against the New York Giants, he had the best offensive performance in his career subbing in for Davis after the former tore his Achilles tendon early in the first half. He would score his second career touchdown in the Week 11 win against the Philadelphia Eagles.

Set to be a free agent in the 2013 season, Paulsen re-signed with the Redskins to a $4 million, three-year contract with another $3 million in incentives, on March 9, 2013.

After it was announced that Paulsen would miss the entire 2015 season due to needing toe surgery, the Redskins placed him on injured reserve on August 16, 2015.

On March 11, 2016, Paulsen re-signed with the Redskins on a one-year contract. On September 3, 2016, Paulsen was released by the Redskins.

Chicago Bears
On September 4, 2016, the Chicago Bears signed Paulsen to their active 53-man roster.

San Francisco 49ers
On March 9, 2017, Paulsen signed a one-year contract with the San Francisco 49ers. He was released on October 17, 2017, but was re-signed two days later. On October 24, 2017, Paulsen was again released by the 49ers. He was re-signed yet again on November 6, 2017.

Atlanta Falcons

On March 21, 2018, Paulsen signed a one-year contract with the Atlanta Falcons. In Week 4, in the 37–36 loss the Cincinnati Bengals, he scored his first receiving touchdown as a Falcon and his first overall since the 2014 season.

On March 16, 2019, Paulsen re-signed with the Falcons. He was released on August 30, 2019.

Houston Texans
On September 2, 2019, Paulsen signed with the Houston Texans. On October 22, 2019, the Texans released Paulsen.

References

External links
Atlanta Falcons bio
UCLA Bruins bio

1987 births
Living people
American football tight ends
American people of Norwegian descent
Atlanta Falcons players
Chicago Bears players
Houston Texans players
People from Northridge, Los Angeles
Players of American football from Los Angeles
San Francisco 49ers players
Chaminade College Preparatory School (California) alumni
UCLA Bruins football players
Washington Redskins players